The Duchess of Benameji (Spanish: La duquesa de Benamejí) is a 1949 Spanish historical drama film directed by Luis Lucia and starring Amparo Rivelles. The film is set in the nineteenth century, with Rivelles playing dual roles as a countess and a gypsy. The film was an expensive costume production by Spain's largest studio CIFESA. It is an adaptation of the 1932 play of the same name by Antonio and Manuel Machado. Before its release, the censor demanded that it be rewritten to more overtly punish bandits.

Cast
 Amparo Rivelles
 Jorge Mistral
And in alphabetical order
 Manuel Aguilera
 Fernando Aguirre 
 Valeriano Andrés as Teniente 
 Mariano Asquerino 
 Francisco Bernal
 Irene Caba Alba 
 Julia Caba Alba
 Benito Cobeña 
 Alfonso de Córdoba 
 Carlos Díaz de Mendoza 
 Eduardo Fajardo 
 Félix Fernandez 
 Manuel Guitián 
 Casimiro Hurtado 
 José Jaspe 
 Manuel Luna
 Juana Mansó 
 Ángel Martinez 
 Arturo Marín 
 Miguel Pastor
 Manuel Requena
 Antonio Riquelme
 Domingo Rivas

References

Bibliography
 Bentley, Bernard. A Companion to Spanish Cinema. Boydell & Brewer 2008.

External links 

1949 films
Spanish historical drama films
1940s historical drama films
1940s Spanish-language films
Films directed by Luis Lucia
Films set in the 19th century
Spanish films based on plays
Cifesa films
Films scored by Juan Quintero Muñoz
Spanish black-and-white films
1949 drama films
1940s Spanish films